Od Vardara pa do Triglava (trans. From the Vardar to Triglav) is the double live and the third live album by Serbian and former Yugoslav and rock band Riblja Čorba, released in 1996. Album was compiled of bootlegs recorded on Riblja Čorba concerts held in 1988, during their Yugoslav tour.

Album cover
The album cover features the emblem of the Socialist Federal Republic of Yugoslavia.

Track listing

Disc 1
"Ostani đubre do kraja" - 6:52
"Ljuti Rock 'n' Roll" - 4:33
"Tu nema Boga, nema pravde" - 3:58
"Kad padne noć (Upomoć)" - 6:57
"Lud sto posto" - 7:59
"Kaži, ko te ljubi dok sam ja na straži" - 4:09
"Prošlosti (Nisi bila bogzna šta)" - 6:34
"Neke su žene pratile vojnike" - 5:32
"Nemoj da ideš mojom ulicom" - 4:56
"Južna Afrika '85 (Ja ću da pevam)" - 4:16
"Lutka sa naslovne strane" - 4:16

Disc 2
"Ostaću slobodan" - 2:35
"Znam te (Drugoga voli)" - 4:34
"Propala noć" - 3:44
"Pogledaj dom svoj, anđele" - 4:04
"Celu noć te sanjam" - 6:11
"Napolju" - 5:28
"Oko mene" - 4:09
"Amsteradm" - 3:53
"Svirao je Dejvid Bovi" - 3:33
"Zadnji voz za Čačak" - 3:12
"Avionu, slomiću ti krila" - 3:52
"Član mafije" - 6:46

Personnel
Bora Đorđević - vocals, harmonica
Vidoja Božinović - guitar
Nikola Čuturilo - guitar
Miša Aleksić - bass guitar
Miroslav Milatović - drums

See also 
 Jugoslavijo

References 

 EX YU ROCK enciklopedija 1960-2006,  Janjatović Petar;  
 Riblja čorba,  Jakovljević Mirko;  

Riblja Čorba live albums
1996 live albums
One Records (Serbia) live albums